There are fourteen known Byzantine manuscripts of the Book of Job dating from the 9th to 14th centuries, as well as a post-Byzantine codex illuminated with cycle of miniatures. The quantity of Job illustrations survived in the fifteen manuscripts exceeds 1800 pictures. The total is aggregated considerably by single images of Job in other manuscripts, frescoes and carvings.

Book of Job

The theological core of the work and its content have been much discussed since the pre-Christian age, especially the problem of human misfortune and in particular the misfortune of the righteous in relation to the prevailing concept of divine justice. In that it uses as departure point the literary framework of the story of Job, a devout, wealthy and respected man, who, with God's permission, was struck by Satan with the greatest misfortunes. Being a king, according to the Septuagint, Job was the model of the God-fearing, wise and philanthropic ruler who was also enjoying a peaceful life in the bosom of his large family and among his friends. It was precisely this deep piety and the divine favour which incited the envy of Satan who - not without much effort - eventually succeeded in obtaining God's consent to put Job to the test. Thus, in a rapid sequence of calamities, Job is robbed of all his possessions, his herds, his servants, his house and all his ten children. At the very last, smitten himself with the horrible disease of leprosy and abandoned by all, including his wife, he leaves the city and dwells on a dunghill. In spite of all these reversals of fate Job remains steadfast not only to his faith in God, but also to the conviction that this sudden reversal of the divine will cannot be the consequence of his own sins, since he does not believe that such exist. Finally, after many years of trial, God again reverses the just man's fate, restoring to him twofold all his worldly goods and giving him a new family.

The Septuagint and related Job versions

Septuagint
The oldest translation of the Bible in Greek is known as Septuagint. Tradition propagated by the so-called Letter of Aristeas ascribes it in its entirety to a group of seventy Jewish scholars working at the order of Ptolemy II Philadelphus who ruled Egypt from 285 to 246 BCE. Modern research, however, indicates that the letter is a late-2nd-century BCE forgery and the account is mostly legendary. In actuality, the translation was probably carried out in stages between the 3rd and 1st centuries BC and was the work of Greek-speaking Jews of the Diaspora.[1] The only indication for dating the translation of the Book of Job in that chronological framework is an excerpt from a Hellenistic–Judaic work (ʺΠερί Ἰουδαίωνʺ) by the above-mentioned Alexandrian historian Aristeas.[2] This excerpt, which was incorporated by Alexander Polyhistor in his compilation and thus was preserved by Eusebius,[3] contains a brief biography of Job. The striking similarity between this and appendices contained in most Greek manuscripts of the Book of Job (in addition to that, the excerpt – according to the prevailing view – presupposes the Greek translation of the Septuagint), leads to the conclusion that the Book of Job in the Greek translation was known to a writer (Aristeas) before the time of Alexander Polyhistor, that is, about the middle of the 2nd century BC.[4] Furthermore, this date conforms to and confirms the general impression given by the Greek text that it is genuinely Hellenistic, created by and familiar to circles relatively alien to a solely Judaic way of thinking. The character of the Septuagint text mentioned above, which undertakes to give the genealogy of Job and to identify his three friends, is not the only significant deviation-addition peculiar to the Greek edition. The text of the Book of Job shows so many extensive and essential differences from the Hebrew original, that one must infer either deliberate modification of the prototype, at least to a certain extent, by the Greek translator or the use of a prototype unknown today.[5] The most striking peculiarity is the extensive omissions noted and commented on quite early. According to Origen (AD 184–254), the Greek text of the Septuagint was shorter by one sixth than the Hebrew,[6] whereas St. Jerome testifies to a difference of over one fourth.[7] To these omissions, which at present are estimated to total about 187 verses, must be added the abbreviations as well as the padding of frequently free translation, amounting to a paraphrase of the prototype, which all show not only that there was a tendency to abbreviate the prototype but also that the translator apparently does not seem to have troubled himself extensively with the most difficult passages. The passages constituting a plain transcript into Greek of the Hebrew prototype are particularly notable in this respect.[8] Aside from the translator's obvious difficulties with the text, recent studies indicate that the proven deviations were deliberate rather than a consequence merely of the translator's inadequacy.[9] Examined in this light, the Septuagint text seems to express a particular theological tendency, evident in “emendations” of a dogmatic nature, which subsequently permeates the entire Book of Job. The main lines of this new theological approach to the “problem of Job” may be summarized as follows: In the first place, by presenting the devil as the main author of Job's misfortune, God is generally portrayed much milder than in the Hebrew original. Secondly, there is the tendency in the speeches to moderate the intensity of Job's polemic on God's will and conception of justice. Thus the Job of the Septuagint translation is not at all like the Job of the Hebrew prototype. This is so, not only because his speeches in the Septuagint are less provocative in tone, but also because a new element of patient submission and humility, unknown in the prototype, has been introduced here for the first time. These modifications which will turn out to be the chief characteristics of the hero of the story as presented in the Testament of Job will also be the basic element of the mediaeval Christian tradition in which Job appears as a big sufferer –the very model of patience and justice. The friends’ speeches have been similarly “emended”. Those of Elihu especially seem to have experienced more serious alterations. The main consequences of all these changes is that Job's standpoint is not clearly discerned from that of his friends, and, therefore, the problem itself is no longer as prominently outlined as in the prototype. The development of this dogmatic expunging culminates in the Testament of Job, where the atrophied dialogue does not preserve even a trace of the philosophical-theological analysis of the problem provided in the original poem. The Testament of Job is therefore thought by several scholars to be based entirely on the Greek translation.[10] Before concluding this brief survey of the textual problems, the remaining Greek translations must also be mentioned, since they were taken into account by the Church Fathers in their commentaries on the Book of Job and could, therefore, have a bearing on the iconography.

Independent translations
The earliest independent Greek translations of the Bible, which were also taken into account by Origen in his edition of the Hexapla, originated firstly in the opposition of Judaic theology to the Greek translation of the Septuagint after it had been officially accepted by the Christian Church and, secondly, with the intention to replace the Septuagint with a translation based on the unofficial standardized Hebrew text. These were the translations by Akylas, Theodotion, and Symmachus, the first of which dated about AD 130, and the other two in the 2nd and 3rd centuries respectively. Akylas is the only one of the three translators to be referred to in all sources as a Jew. According to Eusebius, Symmachus was a Christian, whereas Theodotion is referred to in some sources as a Jew and in others as a Christian.[11] Unfortunately, all three works have only come down to us fragmentary, and they differ significantly from one another in regard to the accuracy in rendering the Hebrew text and in the handling of the Greek language. Akylas’ translation is an attempt to reproduce with the greatest accuracy the details of the Hebrew text. Thus the general characteristic of his version is a bold literalness, which made it acceptable to Jews. This is also true of Symmachus, but with the difference that his effort is combined with excellent Greek. Finally, Theodotion's translation, characterized by a painstaking accuracy in the use of the Greek language combined with careful study of the Hebrew text, has found great response among Christians. It actually seems to be a revision of the translation of the Septuagint, based on the new revised edition of the Hebrew Scriptures. For this reason Origen draws almost exclusively on it to fill the lacunae in the translation of the Septuagint.

The Testament of Job

The earliest and most important text, especially with regard to the illustration of the Book of Job in this category, is the pseudepigraphical Testament of Job, which has survived in its oldest version in Greek, in the Slavonic translation derived from Greek and, in its latest form, from the Syrian and Arabic variants.[12] The earliest mention of the Testament of Job is in the decree of Pope Gelasius, promulgated about AD 496, in which it is condemned as apocryphal: “Liber qui appellatur Testamentum Job apocryphus”.[13]
Literally, it belongs to the “testaments”, an apocryphal body of writings which were compiled to preserve the teachings and the histories of great, usually Biblical, figures whose names they bear.[14] Within this group the Testament of Job is, in its general complexion, more related to the Testament of The Twelve Patriarchs, while, like the Testament of Moses, it is characterized by a close adherence to the Bible text. Each constitute a haggadic commentary upon a canonical book – in other words, a midrash.[15]

Footnotes 
1. For the general historical background of the Septuagint translation cf. E. Schurer, Geschichte des jüdischen Volkes, III, 3rd ed., Leipzig 1898, 304-317 and H.B. Swete, An Introduction to the Old Testament in Greek, 2nd ed., Cambridge 1902, revised by R.R. Ottley, Cambridge 1914 (reprinted New York 1968

2. Cf. thorough investigation of the subject by J. Freudenthal, Hellenistische Studien, Breslau 1875, I, 136–141.

3. Preparatio Evangelica, IX. 25, ed. T. Gifford, Oxford 1903, 430–431.

4. Freudenthal, op. cit., 143; cf. also K. Kohler, The Testament of Job, an Essene Midrash on the Book of Job, in Semitic Studies in Memory of Rev. Alexander Kohut, Berlin 1897, 264-338 and L. Ginzberg, The Legends of the Jews, vol. V, 384, n. 14, Philadelphia 1938–46.

5 This view of an original deviating from the Masoretic text is represented mainly by J. Jeffrey, The Masoretic Text and the Septuagint Compared, with Special Reference to the Book of Job, in Expository Times 36 (1924–25), 70–73. A shorter original than the Septuagint text is supposed by M. Jastrow Jr., The Book of Job. Its Origin, Growth and Interpretation, Philadelphia and London 1920, 93.

6. See Origen's Epistle to Africanus, in A. Roberts et al., Ante-Nicene Fathers, vol. IV (reprint), Grand Rapids (MI) 1989, 386ff. Also see S. Driver - G. Gray, A Critical and Exegetical Commentary on the Book of Job together with a New Translation (The International Critical Commentary), 2nd ed., Edinburgh 1950; LXXI-LXXVI.

7. See Praefatio in Job, in J. Migne (ed.), Patrologia Latina, vol. 28, Paris 1855, 1080.

8. Cf. J. Ziegler, Der textkritische Wert der Septuaginta des Buches Job, Miscellanea Biblica, 2, Rome 1934, 277–296; G. Gerleman, Studies in the Septuagint, I, Book of Job, in Lunds Universitets Arsskrift, vol. 43, Nr. 2, Lund 1946, 17ff.

9. Cf. especially the following studies: Gerleman, op. cit.; K.S. Gehman, The Theological Approach of the Greek Translator of the Book of Job 1-15, in Journal of Biblical Literature LXVIII (1949), 231–240; D.H. Gard, The Exegetical Method of the Greek Translator of the Book of Job, in Journal of Biblical Literature, Monograph Series, vol. VIII, Philadelphia 1952. Cf. also the articles by H.M. Orlinsky, in Hebrew Union College Annual 28 (1957), 53–74; 29 (1958), 229–271; 30 (1959), 153–167; 32 (1961), 229–268; 33 (1962), 119–152; 35 (1964), 57–78. Orlinsky gives a thorough bibliographical survey on the subject.

10. Cf. especially Gerleman, op. cit.

11. For Akylas and Theodotion see . E. Schurer, Geschichte des jüdischen Volkes, III, 3rd ed., Leipzig 1898, 317–324. For Symmachus, see Eusebius, Historia Ecclesiae, VI, 17 and L.J. Liebreich, Notes on the Greek Version of Symmachus, in Journal of Biblical Literature 63 (1944), 397–403. For all Greek versions of the Old Testament cf. Swete, op. cit. (n. 1), 29–58.

12. The Greek manuscripts are: Paris. gr. 2658 of the 11th century; Messina, San Salvatore 29, of the year 1307 AD; Rome, Vat.gr. 1238, of the 13th century; Paris, gr. 938 of the 16th century, which is a transcript of Paris. gr. 2658. Of the Slavonic version there are three manuscripts in Belgrade, Moscow and Săfarik (S. Novakovič, Apokrifna priča o Jovu, in Starine 10 (1878),157-170; G. Polvika, Apokrifna priča o Jovu, loc. cit. 24 (1891), 135–155). The Greek text was first published by Cardinal Angelo Mai (in Scriptorum Veterum Nova Collectio, VII, Rome 1833, 180–191) from the Vatican manuscript. This text was reprinted along with an English translation and a valuable introduction by Kohler. See Kohler, Testament, 264–338. The same year M.R. James printed the text of the Paris manuscript also with a very useful introduction (James, Testament). A critical edition of the text, based on the manuscripts Paris. gr. 2658, Messina and Vatican, is presented by S.P. Brock (The Testament of Job, Edited with an Introduction and Critical Notes – Pseudepigrapha Veteris Testament Greece, II, Leiden 1966). Our references to the Testament text are also from this work. Cf. also R. Kraft et al., The Testament of Job, Society of Biblical Literature, Text and Translations, 5, Pseudepigrapha series, 4, Missoula (MT) 1974 and R. Splittlev, The Testament of Job. Introduction, Translation and Notes (HarvardUniversity Dissertation), Cambridge (MA) 1971. Excerpts of Mai's text are reprinted by S. Baring-Gould in Legends of the Patriarchs, New York 1872, 245–251. There are also several translations: the oldest, in French by Migne, in Dictionnaire desApocryphes, vol. II, Paris 1858, 403 is based on Mai's edition, while that of M. Philonenko (Le Testament de Job, in Semitica, Cahiers publies par l’Institut des Etudes Semitiques de l’Universite de Paris, XVIII, Paris, 1968), also in French, follows Brock's edition, while the German, by P. Riessler (Altjüdisches Schrifttum ausserhalb der Bibel, Augsburg 1928, 1104–1134) follows the edition of James. For a more recent translation, see L. Wills, Ancient Jewish Novels, New York 2002.

13. Cf. Kohler, Testament, 264; James, Testament, LXXIII.

14. E. Kautzsch, Die Apokryphen und Pseudepigraphen des Alten Testaments, I-II, Tübingen 1900; R.H. Charles, The Apocrypha and Pseudepigrapha of the Old Testament, I-II, Oxford 1913. In neitherof these collections is the Testament of Job included. See also J. Reeves (ed.), Tracing the Threads: Studies in the Vitality of Jewish Pseudepigrapha, Atlanta 1994.

15. Cf. James, Testament, LXXXIV and Philonenko, op. cit., 12–13.

List of Byzantine manuscripts with cycles of miniatures

Rome, Biblioteca Apostolica Vaticana, Codex Gr. 749. 

Date: Second half of the 9th century.  Provenance: Italy, (Rome?).
The codex consists of 249 parchment leaves 27.3 x 37.7 cm and 55 miniatures.

Patmos, Monastery of St. John the Theologian, Codex 171 

Date: 9th century (?), Provenance: Asia Minor (?). The manuscript consists of 258 folios 37 x 25.5 cm and 39 miniatures. Several leaves are missing and a later insertion, on page 516, informs us that the codex was purchased by a woman named Eudocia from a Rhodian with the name Leon in the year 959.

Venice, Biblioteca Nazionale Marciana, Codex Gr. 538 

Date: 905 AD,  Provenance: Asia Minor (?). The codex consists of 246 leaves 27 x 37.5 cm and 31 miniatures.

Mount Sinai, Saint Catherine's Monastery, Codex gr.3, 

Date: 11th century. Provenance: Constantinople.  The codex consists of 246 leaves, 34.9 x 24.3 cm and 27 miniatures which are all inserted in the Prologue text.

Jerusalem, Greek Patriarchal Library, Codex Taphou 5 

Date: c. 1300 AD. The codex consists of 260 parchment leaves 25.3 x 36.5 cm and 115 miniatures. At the beginning, three leaves-formerly belonging to a codex of the 11th century are bound with it. Another leaf was cut off and is in the National Library of Russia, St. Petersburg under the shelfmark gr. 382.

Rome, Biblioteca Apostolica Vaticana, Codex Gr. 1231 

Date: First quarter of the 12th century.  Provenance: Cyprus (?).  The manuscript consists of 457 parchment leaves and 149 miniatures. The two texts in the colophon are of great value in determining the codex's date and origin by providing the names of Leon Nikerites and Anna Notara.

Mount Athos, Megisti Lavra Monastery, Codex B. 100 

Date: 12th century.  The codex, incomplete today, begins with the fourth chapter of the Job text and consists of 196 parchment leaves 30 x 22 cm. and 33 miniatures. It is a textkatenen manuscript written in cursive script with large, blocky letters, very much resembling the script of V1231.

Rome, Biblioteca Apostolica Vaticana, Codex Pal. Gr. 230 

Date:  11th to 12th centuries.  The codex consists of 246 parchment leaves and 152 miniatures.

Mount Athos, Vatopedi Monastery, Codex 590 

Date: 13th century.  The codex consists of 168 parchment leaves, measuring about 26.5 x 28.2 cm and includes 48 miniatures, all painted straight on the parchment without a background or frame.

Athens, Byzantine Museum, Codex gr.164 (formerly 62) 

Date: End of the 12th century.  The codex consists of 278 parchment leaves 16.5 x 23.5 cm, and was planned to include 154 miniatures -which were never executed

Oxford, Bodleian Library, MS. Barocci 201 

Date: 12th century.  The codex consists of 253 parchment leaves and 234 miniatures. [#1]

Rome, Biblioteca Apostolica Vaticana, Codex Gr. 751 

Date:  End of the 12th to the beginning of the 13th century.  The codex, at present has 168 parchment leaves and 227 miniatures.

Paris, Bibliothèque Nationale, Codex Gr. 134 

Date: 13th (?) - beginning of the 14th century.  The codex consists of 210 parchment leaves 22.5 x 23.5 cm and 176 miniatures.

Paris, Bibliothèque Nationale, Codex Gr. 135 

Date: 1362 AD. Scribe:  Manuel Tzykandyles.  The oldest paper edition of the group, consisting of 247 folios 30.5 x 39 cm and 198 miniatures inserted in various ways in the text with the scenes shown without background or frame.

Oxford, Bodleian Library, MS. Laud Gr. 86 

Date:  16th century.  It consists of 220 paper leaves - with page numeration – and includes 205 miniatures. [#2]

LXX Book of Job References [#3] 
Miniature Captions

Chapter I (1)
1 There was a certain man in the land of Ausis, whose name was Job; and than man was true, blameless, righteous, and godly, abstaining from everything evil.

2 And he had seven sons and three daughters.

3 And his cattle consisted of seven thousand sheep, three thousand camels, five hundred yoke of oxen, five hundred she-asses in the pastures, and a very great household, and he had a great husbandry on the earth; and that man was most noble of the men of the east.

13 And it came to pass on a certain day, that Job's sons and his daughters were drinking wine in the house of their elder brother.

14 And, behold, there came a messenger to Job, and said to him, The yokes of oxen were ploughing, and the she-asses were feeding near them; 

15 and the spoilers came and took them for a prey, and slew the servants with the sword; and I having escaped alone am come to tell thee.

17 While he was yet speaking, there came another messenger, and said to Job, The horsemen formed three companies against us, and surrounded the camels, and took them for a prey, and slew the servants with the sword; and I only escaped, and am come to tell thee.

18 While he is yet speaking, another messenger comes, saying to Job, While thy sons and thy daughters were eating and drinking with their elder brother, 

19 suddenly a great wind came on from the desert, and caught the four corners of the house, and the house fell upon thy children, and they are dead; and I have escaped alone, and am come to tell thee

Chapter II (2)
7 So the devil went out from the Lord, and smote Job with sore boils from his feet to his head.

9 And when much time had passed, his wife said to him, How long wilt thou hold out, saying, Behold, I wait yet a little while, expecting the hope of my deliverance? for, behold, thy memorial is abolished from the earth, even thy sons and daughters, the pangs and pains of my womb which I bore in vain with sorrows; and thou thyself sittest down to spend the nights in the open air among the corruption of worms, and I am a wanderer and a servant from place to place and house to house, waiting for the setting of the sun, that I may rest from my labours and my pangs which now beset me: but say some word against the Lord, and die. 

10 But he looked on her, and said to her, Thou hast spoken like one of the foolish women. If we have received good things of the hand of the Lord, shall we not endure evil things? 
In all these things that happened to him, Job sinned not at all with his lips before God.

12 And when they saw him from a distance they did not know him; and they cried with a loud voice, and wept, and rent every one his garment, and sprinkled dust upon their heads,

13 and they sat down beside him seven days and seven nights, and no one of them spoke; for they saw that his affliction was dreadful and very great.

Chapter IV (4)
1 Then Eliphaz the Thaemanite answered and said,

10 The strength of the lion, and the voice of the lioness, and the exulting cry of serpents are quenched.

11 The old lion has perished for want of food, and the lions’ whelps have forsaken one another.

Chapter IX (9)

8 Who alone has stretched out the heavens, and walks on the sea as on firm ground

13 For if he has turned away his anger, the whales under heaven have stooped under him.

Chapter XVI (16)

10 In his anger he has cast me down; he has gnashed his teeth upon me: the weapons of his robbers have fallen upon me.

11 He has attacked me with the keen glances of his eyes; with his sharp spear he has smitten me down upon my knees; and they have run upon me with one accord. 

12 For the Lord has delivered me into the hands of unrighteous men, and thrown me upon the ungodly.

13 When I was at peace he distracted me: he took me by the hair of the head, and plucked it out: he set me up as a mark.

14 They surrounded me with spears, aiming at my reins: without sparing me they poured out my gall upon the ground

Chapter XX (20)
26 And let all darkness wait for him: a fire that burns not out shall consume him; and let a stranger plague his house.

27 And let the heaven reveal his iniquities, and the earth rise up against him

Chapter XXVI (26)
13 And the barriers of heaven fear him, and by a command he has slain the apostate dragon

Chapter XXIX (29)
1 And Job continued and said in his parable,

Chapter XXXVIII (38)
1 And after Elius had ceased from speaking, the Lord spoke to Job through the whirlwind and clouds, saying,

36 And who has given to women skill in weaving, or knowledge of embroidery

Chapter XXXIX (39)
5 And who is he that sent forth the wild ass free? and who loosed his bands?

6 whereas I made his habitation the wilderness, and the salt land his coverts.

26 And does the hawk remain steady by thy wisdom, having spread out her wings unmoved, looking toward the region of the south?

27 And does the eagle rise at thy command, and the vulture remain sitting over his nest,. 

28 on a crag of a rock, and in a secret place?

29 Thence he seeks food, his eyes observe from far. 

30 And his young ones roll themselves in blood, and wherever the carcasses may be, immediately they are found.

Chapter XL (40)
16 He lies under trees of every kind, by the papyrus, and reed, and bulrush. 

17 And the great trees make a shadow over him with their branches, and so do the bushes of the field.

20 But wilt thou catch the serpent with a hook, and put a halter about his nose? 

21 Or wilt thou fasten a ring in his nostril, and bore his lip with a clasp?

24 And wilt thou play with him as with a bird? or bind him as a sparrow for a child?

Chapter XLI (41)
5 Who will open the doors of his face? terror is round about his teeth

22 He makes the deep boil like a brazen caldron; and he regards the sea as a pot of ointment, 

23 and the lowest part of the deep as a captive: he reckons the deep as his range. 

24 There is nothing upon the earth like to him, formed to be sported with by my angels. 

25 He beholds every high thing: and he is king of all that are in the waters.

Chapter XLII (42)
8 Now then take seven bullocks, and seven rams, and go to my servant Job, and he shall offer a burnt-offering for you. And my servant Job shall pray for you, for I will only accept him: for but his sake, I would have destroyed you, for ye have not spoken the truth against my servant Job.

9 So Eliphaz the Thaemanite, and Baldad the Sauchite, and Sophar the Minaean, went and did as the Lord commanded them: and he pardoned their sin for the sake of Job.

11 And all his brethren and his sisters heard all that had happened to him, and they came to him, and so did all that had known him from the first: and they ate and drank with him, and comforted him, and wondered at all that the Lord had brought upon him: and each one gave him a lamb, and four drachms’ weight of gold, even of unstamped gold.

17 And Job died, an old man and full of days: and it is written that he will rise again with those whom the Lord raises up.

See also 

 Book of Job
 Coptic Bible
 List of illuminated manuscripts
 Miniature (illuminated manuscript)
 Sarcophagus of Junius Bassus
 William Blake's Illustrations of the Book of Job

Bibliography 
 Brubaker, Leslie: Vision and Meaning in Ninth-Century Byzantium.  & 
 Devoge, Jeanne: Quand Job tombe malade etude litteraire et iconographique d’une scene biblique d’apres la Septante. UDC 75.057.033.046.3 & UDC 801.73:27-243.62
 Hagedorn, Ursula & Dieter: Die älteren griechischen Katenen zum Buch Hiob.  &   
 Blake, William: Illustrations of The Book of Job - (Gutenberg Project).  https://www.gutenberg.org/ebooks/30526
 Papadaki-Oekland, Stella: Byzantine Illuminated Manuscripts of the Book of Job.  & 
  [#3] The Septuagint LXX in English by Sir Lancelot Brenton

External links 
 Oxford, Bodleian Library MS. Barocci 201
 Oxford, Bodleian Library MS. Laud Gr. 86

Byzantine
Job
Book of Job
Christian iconography
Job
Art depicting Old Testament people